Sucker Money is a 1933 American Pre-Code film directed by Dorothy Davenport and Melville Shyer. The film is also known as Victims of the Beyond in the United Kingdom.

Premise
A phony spiritualist, Yomurda, uses fake seances and hypnotism to convince a banker's daughter to steal her father's money. He's exposed by a journalist, who turns him over to the police.

Cast
Mischa Auer as Swami Yomurda
Phyllis Barrington as Clare Walton
Earl McCarthy as Jimmy Reeves
Ralph Lewis as John Walton
Fletcher Norton as Dan Lukes
Mae Busch as Mame
Mona Lisa as Princess Karami
Al Bridge as George Hunter
J. Frank Glendon as Meehan

References

External links 

1933 films
1933 romantic drama films
1933 crime drama films
American black-and-white films
American romantic drama films
American crime drama films
Films directed by Dorothy Davenport
Films directed by Melville Shyer
1930s English-language films
1930s American films